Susan Barlow (also Baldwin) is a fictional character from the British ITV soap opera Coronation Street. She made her debut screen appearance on 5 April 1965. Susan has been portrayed by four actresses since her introduction. Katie Heannau was the first actress to play the character, appearing sporadically in the 1960s uncredited. Wendy Jane Walker took over the role for 26 episodes between 1970 and 1971 and between 1973 and 1974. When the character returned, Suzy Paterson was recast in the role. She appeared in eight episodes from December 1979 until July 1981. Walker reprised the role on a permanent basis from October 1985 until November 1987. The fourth actress to play the role was Joanna Foster, who appeared in eight episodes in 2001 until the character was killed off. The character's final appearance was on 11 February 2001.

Storylines
Susan was the daughter of Ken and Valerie Barlow and twin sister of Peter Barlow. She was born on 5 April 1965 after Len Fairclough drove Valerie to the hospital in his van. Most of Susan's early storylines were alongside her twin brother, Peter.

Valerie's life changed completely as her time was spent looking after the twins and Ken. The Barlows had many friends and could easily find babysitters, allowing Valerie to attend evening classes in Sociology. In November 1965, Ken was looking after the twins but when he visited The Rovers Return briefly, a piece of coal fell from the fire and filled the house with smoke. Valerie came home before Ken put the fire out but was outraged that he had left the babies alone while he went to buy cigarettes. Valerie told Ken she would leave him if he ever smoked again.

In 1966, Ken had a fling with reporter, Jackie Marsh. Valerie left him briefly and took the twins to Glasgow but returned when he convinced her that he would be a more devoted husband and father from then on.

In 1968, the Mission of Glad Tidings and Elliston's Raincoat Factory across the Street were torn down to make way for a block of maisonettes. As they were being demolished, Ken and Valerie realised the twins were missing. They were found in the factory just before the wrecking ball hit.

In 1969, Susan's maternal grandmother, Edith, stayed with the Barlows. When Edith took the twins to the fair, she lost them but they were found by an elderly woman who had taken them in and not contacted the family.

In January 1971, Ken was offered a teaching position in Jamaica and Valerie agreed to emigrate with the twins. However, Valerie died when she was electrocuted by a faulty hairdryer. Later in the year, Peter and Susan were sent to live in Scotland with their maternal grandparents after Ken struggled to make suitable childcare arrangements and continue to work as a teacher. Susan came back to Weatherfield to visit her father in 1973 and 1974.

Susan returned to Coronation Street again for New Year's Eve 1979, and stayed with her father and his girlfriend Deirdre Langton into the New Year. Susan then went travelling and visited Ken again in April 1980, along with her boyfriend Craig Brennan, who Ken did not approve of. Susan visited again for Ken and Deirdre's wedding in July 1981. Susan went back to Scotland, and decided to attend university.

In 1985, Susan returned again now working as a market researcher. She began an affair with her father's sworn enemy Mike Baldwin and they got engaged but Ken refused to attend as he hated Mike and could not come to terms with the fact he was marrying his little girl. But after a lot of thinking and talking to Susan, Peter and Deirdre he walked Susan down the aisle on 6 May 1986. The marriage failed, because Susan's career ambitions did not fit in with Mike's plans for the future. When she got pregnant, Mike wanted her to abandon her business; Susan decided to have an abortion. Mike branded her a killer and a murdering bitch and she left him and moved to Newcastle after just a year of marriage in November 1987.

By December 2000, Peter was living with Ken and Deirdre. While arguing with Ken, Peter let slip that Susan had a son. Ken insisted Peter explain, which he did, telling Ken that Susan had lied about the abortion and gave birth to her son, Adam in May 1988. Susan had only told Peter this. Ken went to Scotland the following month to visit Susan and she made him swear not to tell Mike. Ken told Deirdre and she told Dev Alahan. He told Mike who called Susan and demanded access. Susan, who was visiting her father and brother, refused. Mike threatened her with legal action. Susan tried to flee again with Adam to Ireland, but while driving on the M6, her car crashed into a tree. Susan was killed instantly but Adam suffered only minor injuries. Susan's body was taken back to Weatherfield for her funeral, and she was buried next to her mother, Valerie. Peter, Adam, Ken and his other son Daniel Osbourne occasionally talk about Susan since she died.

Casting
Katie Heannau played Susan as a baby and young child from 1965 until 1970 when Heannau and her family moved away from the Manchester area. Child actress Wendy Jane Walker took over the role later in 1970. Although Susan was written out in 1971, Walker made recurring appearances in 1973 and 1974. Suzy Patterson played Susan from 1979 to 1981 but only made a small number of appearances. Walker took back the role in 1985 and Susan became a main character again before departing in 1987. Patterson had played the role with a strong Scots accent, whereas Walker did not. After a thirteen-year absence, Susan returned for a final time in early 2001, now played by Joanna Foster, which saw the character get killed off after introducing her secret son Adam.

Development
In January 2001, the character returned to Coronation Street with actress Joanna Foster taking over the role. Susan comes back to Weatherfield to introduce her son, Adam (Iain de Caestecker) to his grandfather, Ken (William Roache). Rick Fulton of the Daily Record said Ken is "amazed, but also devastated" that Susan kept his grandson a secret for so long. Adam's father is Mike Baldwin (Johnny Briggs), who Susan married in 1986. Susan told Mike she had an abortion and he threw her out the following year. Fulton explained "But that will be exposed as a lie. It seems Susan, who had grown to hate her husband, didn't think Mike would be a fit father for her child. She decided she wanted to bring up the baby on her own without any of his influence." The news rocks Ken and Mike, when they learn they are linked by Adam. On 22 January 2001, Brian Roberts of the Daily Mirror reported Susan would be killed off in a car accident. Her death would then kick-start a custody battle for her son, Adam, between her father and her ex-husband. Roberts said Susan is "adamant" that she does not want Mike having anything to do with Adam and she decides to take him to Ireland. However, while they are on their way Susan crashes the car and dies.

Reception
Johnny Briggs disapproved of the storyline that saw his character (Mike Baldwin) marry Susan as he thought it would tie his character down. He also did not get on with Walker and was pleased when the relationship broke up. The Daily Mirror's Charlie Catchpole described Susan as the "hapless" wife and daughter of Mike and Ken. He commented on her 2001 recast saying "I don't know why either of them believed a word she said, since Susan had been blonde and blue-eyed, and this impostor had black hair and brown eyes." Catchpole added that Susan's off screen death was one of the soap world's cruelest exits.

References

Coronation Street characters
Fictional twins
Television characters introduced in 1965
Female characters in television